Franco Bernini  (born in 1954) is an Italian director and screenwriter.

Born in Viterbo, Bernini entered the cinema industry in 1987 as a sound screenwriter, and was a close collaborator of Carlo Mazzacurati and Daniele Luchetti. After directing two television films, in 1997 he directed The Grey Zone, for which he won the Grolla d'oro for best screenplay.

References

External links 
 

1954 births
20th-century Italian people
Italian film directors
Italian screenwriters
People from Viterbo
Living people
Italian male screenwriters